Tarawa is an atoll in the Republic of Kiribati. 

Tarawa may also refer to:

In military:
 Battle of Tarawa, fought on the Tarawa atoll in World War II
 Tarawa class amphibious assault ship, a class of ships in the US Navy
 USS Tarawa (CV-40), a United States Navy Essex-class aircraft carrier built in 1944
 USS Tarawa (LHA-1), a United States Navy amphibious assault ship built in 1971
Naval Base Tarawa US Navy 1943-1945

In geography:
 Pacific/Tarawa, a time zone UTC+12
 Tarawa, North Carolina, United States
 Tarawa (Nigeria), Nigeria
 Taroa, also known as Tarawa, an island in the Marshall Islands

Other:
 Tarawa, an Earth Alliance aircraft carrier from the Mobile Suit Gundam SEED Television series
 Tarawa, a piece from the soundtrack of Snow Falling on Cedars by James Newton Howard
 Tarawa (web framework), a web application framework in Python
 Tarawa, Hittite midwife goddesses

See also
 South Tarawa, capital of Kiribati
 Tebua Tarawa, Makin Islands, Kiribati